Scotgate Ash Quarry or Scot Gate Ash Quarry, was the collective name for extensive quarry workings that were on the northern edge of Pateley Bridge, North Yorkshire, England. When the quarry was last in use, the area was in the West Riding of Yorkshire, and was described as being the largest quarry in West Yorkshire.

After 1872, building stone from Scotgate Ash was exported from the quarry site firstly by incline into the town of Pateley Bridge and thence by train on the Nidd Valley Railway (NVR). Because of its durability and hard-wearing nature, Scotgate Ash stone was used in building the platforms at many mainline railway stations in the United Kingdom, as well as being in demand as a building stone, not only in the locality, but also at a national level with many significant buildings in London using Scotgate Ash stone.

History

Between the early 14th century and 1915, Scotgate Ash Quarry above the northern edge of Pateley Bridge, supplied Dimension stone (which was known commercially as Delph Stone) that was used in many buildings in Yorkshire and London.

The Metcalfe family, who were landholders in the locality, had a major stake in Scot Gate Ash Quarry and by 1880, because of their influence, the quarry was the largest in the West Riding of Yorkshire. The Metcalfe's installed a standard gauge inclined tramway in 1872 to transport the stone down the hill to the goods sidings west of Pateley Bridge railway station. The incline had many escape routes and, like many inclines in Britain, the loaded wagons moving downhill forced empty wagons to ascend the incline on the other line. The incline bottom connected directly into the NVR sidings with an additional spur onto the  Nidd Valley Light Railway. The incline crossed Corporation Road in the town before joining the branchline sidings at Millfield Street. The opening of the incline allowed stone to be transported into Pateley Bridge in a matter of minutes instead of several hours by horse and cart.

The quarry produced flags and stone, which were from the Libishaw Sandstone bed. This stone was also used in the building of Scar House Reservoir further up the valley. Libishaw Sandstone is described as "fine to medium-grained, micaeous, feldspathic, thin bedded sandstone of variable colour (buff, brown, pale yellow, and grey) was quarried widely in the C19 on the north side of Pateley Bridge". Some of the stone was won by mining rather than surface quarrying and whilst spoil heaps are still in evidence, any mining shafts have been filled in. By 1889, seven distinct working areas were spread out across the hill above Pateley Bridge, all operating as Scotgate Ash Quarry.

The arrival of the railway in Pateley Bridge in 1862, afforded the quarry owners the ability to export the stone from the dale for the first time. Scotgate Ash stone was used in building the National Gallery, the National Safe Deposit Bank and Kensington Museum in London and the government works at Aldershot, Enfield, Plymouth, Portsmouth and York. It was also used extensively for many buildings in Harrogate, the Station Hotel in York, and for post offices in Newcastle, Sunderland and Durham. Other uses included steps for public buildings and edging stones for dockyards and harbours because of its high resistance to crushing.

Five steam cranes were in operation and the workings employed over 500 men and boys. In October 1892, the valley suffered from extreme rainfall which caused huge rockfalls in the quarry area and the resultant flooding destroyed the incline.

English Heritage have described the site remains as "striking". The incline survives (and is shown on mapping) along with various buildings (the manager's office, drum house for the incline, etc.) and a reservoir at the eastern edge of the site. Access to the site is easily available as it, and the former incline course, are both on public footpaths.

Notes

References

Sources

Quarries in North Yorkshire
Nidderdale